The Mitsubishi Racing Lancer (code-named MRX09) is a cross-country rally car developed by Mitsubishi Motors for competing in 2009 Dakar rally. "MRX09" stands for Mitsubishi Rally X-Country. The car was built to the FIA's Group T1 rules, and competed in the 2009 Dakar Rally. It has a tubular steel frame with carbon fiber bodywork. Unlike previous Mitsubishi cross-country rally cars, the Racing Lancer's bodywork resembles the Mitsubishi Lancer Sportback instead of the Mitsubishi Pajero.

References

External links

 2009 Dakar participation with four diesel-turbo Racing Lancers 
 Mitsubishi Motors' Motorsports official blog: 2009 Dakar Rally 

Racing Lancer
All-wheel-drive vehicles
Rally raid cars